2,6-beta-fructan 6-levanbiohydrolase (beta-2,6-fructan-6-levanbiohydrolase, 2,6-beta-D-fructan 6-levanbiohydrolase, levanbiose-producing levanase, 2,6-beta-D-fructan 6-beta-D-fructofuranosylfructohydrolase) is an enzyme with systematic name (2->6)-beta-D-fructofuranan 6-(beta-D-fructosyl)-D-fructose-hydrolase. This enzyme catalyses the following chemical reaction

 Hydrolysis of (2->6)-beta-D-fructofuranan, to remove successive disaccharide residues as levanbiose, i.e. 6-(beta-D-fructofuranosyl)-D-fructose, from the end of the chain

References

External links 
 

EC 3.2.1